Abell may refer to:

People
Abell (surname)
George O. Abell, of the astronomical catalogues fame

Places
United States
 Abell, Maryland, a location in St. Mary's County, Maryland
 Abell, a neighborhood in Baltimore, Maryland
 Abells Corners, Wisconsin, an unincorporated community

Astronomy 
Abell catalogue of rich clusters of galaxies (ACO)
Abell Catalog of Planetary Nebulae (A)

Bibliographical database
ABELL, the Annual Bibliography of English Language and Literature

See also
Abel (disambiguation)